The 1975 Kansas Jayhawks football team represented the University of Kansas as a member of the Big Eight Conference during the 1975 NCAA Division I football season. In their first season under head coach Bud Moore, the Jayhawks compiled a overall record of 7–5 record with a mark of 4–3 against conference opponents, finished in fourth place in the Big 8, and outscored their opponents by a combined total of 262 to 180. Kansas was invited to the Sun Bowl, where they lost to Pittsburgh. The team played home games at Memorial Stadium in Lawrence, Kansas.
om November 8 the Oklahoma sooners were dramatic upset in Norman Oklahoma at home 23-3, to become bowl eligible 
The team's statistical leaders included Nolan Cromwell with 333 passing yards and 1,223 rushing yards, and Waddell Smith with 205 receiving yards. Rick Kovatch, John Morgan, and Steve Taylor were the team captains.

Schedule

Roster

References

Kansas
Kansas Jayhawks football seasons
Kansas Jayhawks football